David Feldman may refer to:

 David Feldman (author) (born 1950), American writer
 David Feldman (comedian), American comedy writer and performer
 David Feldman (historian), British historian
 David Feldman (lawyer), British lawyer
 David Feldman (musician) (born 1977), Brazilian-Israeli jazz and bossa nova musician
 David Feldman (philatelist) (born 1947), Irish philatelist and chairman of Swiss philatelic auction company
 David B. Feldman, American psychologist
 David N. Feldman (born 1960), American lawyer
 David Matthew Feldman, puppeteer and voice of Mayor Milford Meanswell in the Icelandic children's TV series LazyTown
 Dave Feldman (born 1965), American sportscaster
 David Feldman (born 1970), former boxer and Bare Knuckle FC president